The ptilinum is an eversible pouch on the head, above the base of the antenna in schizophoran flies (a section of muscomorphan and cyclorrhaphan flies). It is used to force off the end of the puparium in order for the fly to emerge, and after this inflation at emergence, the ptilinum collapses back inside the head, marked thereafter only by the ptilinal suture or frontal suture (which defines the aperture through which it everts).

References 
 Bugguide.net. ptilinum, ptilinal suture
Insect anatomy